Ján Haspra (born 29 May 1969) is a Slovak professional football manager and former player who is currently manager of 2. Liga club FC Petržalka.

References

External links
 Futbalnet profile
 
 Fortuna Liga profile

1969 births
Living people
Slovak footballers
Slovak football managers
Association football forwards
MFK Ružomberok players
SFC Opava players
1. FC Slovácko players
MFK Ružomberok managers
FC Petržalka managers
Slovak Super Liga players
Slovak Super Liga managers
Expatriate footballers in the Czech Republic